Ghost Adventures: Aftershocks was an American paranormal documentary and reality television series that aired from April 26, 2014 to November 5, 2016 on the Travel Channel. Like the main Ghost Adventures series, the series was hosted and narrated by Zak Bagans.

The show featured Zak Bagans revisiting former Ghost Adventures cases. Interviews took place in an undisclosed location in Las Vegas. New audio and/or video evidence from previous Ghost Adventures episodes were sometimes featured.

Episodes

Season 1 (2014)

Season 2 (2015)

Season 3 (2015–16)

See also

 Paranormal Challenge
 Paranormal Lockdown
 Deadly Possessions

References

External links

Travel Channel original programming
Paranormal reality television series
2010s American reality television series
2014 American television series debuts
American television spin-offs
Ghost Adventures
2016 American television series endings
Reality television spin-offs